Riccardo Ferrara (born 14 July 1995) is an Italian football player who plays for ACD Città di Sant'Agata.

Club career
He made his professional debut in the Lega Pro for Lucchese on 8 May 2016 in a game against Carrarese which his team lost with a score of 4–5.

On 19 August 2019, he signed with Serie D club Casarano. However, on month later, he left Casarano and joined Serie D club Acireale on 13 September 2019. On 6 December 2019, Ferrara made his third transfer in 2019 and joined ACD Città di Sant'Agata.

References

External links
 

1995 births
Footballers from Palermo
Living people
Italian footballers
Trapani Calcio players
S.S. Maceratese 1922 players
S.S.D. Lucchese 1905 players
S.S.D. Acireale Calcio 1946 players
Serie C players
Association football goalkeepers